C. robusta may refer to:
 Calceolispongia robusta, a cladid crinoid species that lived along the shores of eastern Gondwanaland that correspond to Timor and Western Australia, today
 Camerata robusta, a flat worm species
 Ceratozamia robusta, a plant species found in Belize, Guatemala and Mexico
 Cheungbeia robusta, a sea snail species
 Chorizanthe robusta, a flowering plant species endemic to California
 Compsomantis robusta, a praying mantis species found in Borneo
 Conraua robusta, a frog species found in Cameroon and Nigeria
 Coprosma robusta, the karamu, a tree species found in New Zealand
 Crateroscelis robusta, the mountain mouse-warbler, a bird species found in Indonesia and Papua New Guinea

Synonyms 
 Coffea robusta, a synonym for Coffea canephora, the robusta coffee, a plant species  which has its origins in central and western subsaharan Africa

See also 
 Robusta (disambiguation)